Professor Alfred Lodge MA (1854 – 1 December 1937), was an English mathematician, author, and the first president of The Mathematical Association.

Alfred Lodge was born in 1854 at Penkhull, Staffordshire, one of nine children to Oliver Lodge (1826–1884) and Grace, née Heath (1826–1879). His siblings included physicist Sir Oliver Lodge, and historians Sir Richard Lodge and Eleanor Constance Lodge. He attended Horncastle Grammar School, afterwards studying at Magdalen College, Oxford. In 1876 he became a fellow of St John's College, Oxford, and in 1884 joined the Royal Indian Engineering College at Egham, there becoming a professor of pure mathematics, succeeding Joseph Wolstenholme in 1889. From 1904 until after the First World War he was a master at Charterhouse School. In 1897 Lodge became the first president of The Mathematical Association after its name change from The Association for the Improvement of Geometrical Teaching.

Lodge was at times associated with his brother Oliver Lodge's preoccupation with psychic phenomena, although stating that his interest only lay where this seemed to apply to mathematics.

Alfred Lodge died at Oxford on 1 December 1937. He was father of two sons, Charles and Christopher.

Selected publications
1895 – Mensuration for senior students. 
1899 – Matter, Ether and Motion: The Factors and Relations of Physical Science, edited English edition by Professor Alfred Lodge.
1904 – Elementary mechanics including hydrostatics and pneumatics, with Oliver Lodge and Charles S. Lodge. 
1905 – Differential Calculus for Beginners. 
1905 – Integral calculus for beginners. 
1906 – "Semi-convergent Series for JnX" in Report of the British Association for the Advancement of Science, 76th. Annual Meeting, York
1910 – "Reports on the State of Science" committee report on The Further tabulation of Bessel Functions, for the British Association for the Advancement of Science, 80th Annual Meeting, Sheffield
1923 – Differential Calculus for Beginners – Primary Source Edition. 
1927 – "The Graphic Solution of Quadratic Equations", The Mathematical Gazette
1933 – paper on the "Larmor-Lorentz transformations", published in the Philosophical Magazine; co-written Oliver Lodge

References

1854 births
1937 deaths
People from Penkhull
19th-century English mathematicians
Alumni of Magdalen College, Oxford